Fresh Meat is the debut album of the English electronic rock band Arkarna. It was released in the United States on August 26, 1997. Its moderate success was proven by two of the songs getting frequent radio air time, "House on Fire" and "Eat Me", the former of which appeared on the Batman & Robin soundtrack. The track "So Little Time" was the theme song to the television series of the same name.

Track listing
"House on Fire"  – 5:28
"Eat Me"  – 4:05
"The Future's Overrated"  – 6:50
"So Little Time"  – 5:08
"Block Capital"  – 4:20
"Born Yesterday" - Part 1  – 4:07
"Born Yesterday" - Part 2  – 3:04
"Peace Of Mind"  – 5:21
"Direct Dubit"  – 4:59
"R. U. Ready"  – 8:29
"House on Fire (Acoustic)" – 3:01 (bonus, hidden track)
The last song is a bonus hidden track after "R. U. Ready". Total time of final track is 21:33, including the ten minutes of silence between songs.

Charts

References

1997 debut albums
Arkarna albums
Reprise Records albums